Iain Alexander Douglas Blair Cochrane, 15th Earl of Dundonald (born 17 February 1961), styled Lord Cochrane until 1986, is a Scottish peer.
He was a member of the House of Lords from 1986 until the reforms made by the House of Lords Act 1999.

Early life
Dundonald is the only son of Iain Cochrane, 14th Earl of Dundonald and his first wife Aphra Farquhar (d. 1972).

He was educated at Wellington College and RAC Cirencester. He succeeded his father in the earldom in 1986, and became chairman of Duneth Securities in the same year.

Personal life
On 4 July 1987, Dundonald married Beatrice L. Russo, of Gibraltar, by whom he has two sons and a daughter:
Archibald Iain Thomas Cochrane, Lord Cochrane (b. 1991)
Lady Marina Aphra Mariola Cochrane (b. 1992)
Hon. James Douglas Richard Cochrane (b. 1995)

Dundonald and his wife separated and were divorced in 2011.

He lives at Lochnell Castle and is the honorary Chilean consul to Scotland. He has been a director of Anglo Digital, Ltd., since 2000.

References

1961 births
Living people
People educated at Wellington College, Berkshire
Alumni of the Royal Agricultural University
15
Iain
Dundonald